The Chevrolet Camaro is a mid-size American automobile manufactured by Chevrolet, classified as a pony car. It first went on sale on September 29, 1966, for the 1967 model year and was designed to compete with the Ford Mustang. The Camaro shared its platform and major components with the Firebird, produced by General Motors' Pontiac division that was also introduced for 1967.

Four distinct generations of the Camaro were developed before production ended in 2002. The nameplate was revived on a concept car that evolved into the fifth-generation Camaro; production started on March 16, 2009.

The Camaro is expected to be discontinued in 2025.

Background 
Before any official announcement, reports began running during April 1965 within the automotive press that Chevrolet was preparing a competitor to the Ford Mustang, code-named Panther. On June 21, 1966, around 200 automotive journalists received a telegram from General Motors stating, "...please save noon of June 28 for important SEPAW meeting. Hope you can be on hand to help scratch a cat. Details will follow...(signed) John L. Cutter – Chevrolet public relations – SEPAW secretary." The following day, the same journalists received another General Motors telegram stating, "Society for the Eradication of Panthers from the Automotive World will hold first and last meeting on June 28...(signed) John L. Cutter – Chevrolet public relations SEPAW secretary." These telegrams puzzled automotive journalists.

On June 28, 1966, General Motors held a live press conference in Detroit's Statler-Hilton Hotel. It was the first time that 14 cities were connected in real-time for a press conference via telephone lines. Chevrolet general manager Pete Estes started the news conference stating that all attendees of the conference were charter members of the Society for the Elimination of Panthers from the Automotive World and that this would be the first and last meeting of SEPAW. Estes then announced a new car line, project designation XP-836, with a name that Chevrolet chose in keeping with other car names beginning with the letter C such as the Corvair, Chevelle, Chevy II, and Corvette. He claimed the name, "suggests the comradeship of good friends as a personal car should be to its owner" and that "to us, the name means just what we think the car will do... go." The Camaro name was then unveiled. Automotive press asked Chevrolet product managers, "what is a Camaro?" and were told it was "a small, vicious animal that eats Mustangs," an obvious reference to the Ford Mustang, which created and dominated the Pony car market GM was entering.

According to the book The Complete Book of Camaro: Every Model Since 1967, the name Camaro was conceived by Chevrolet merchandising manager Bob Lund and General Motors vice president Ed Rollett, while they were reading the book Heath's French and English Dictionary by James Boïelle and by de V. Payen-Payne printed in 1936. In the book The Complete Book of Camaro, it states that Mr. Lund and Mr. Rollett found the word camaro in the French-English dictionary was slang, to mean "friend, pal, or comrade". The article further repeated Estes's statement of what the word camaro was meant to imply, that the car's name "suggests the comradeship of good friends, as a personal car should be to its owner". The accepted French word with the closest meaning is "camarade," from which the English word "comrade" is derived.

The Camaro was first shown at a press preview in Detroit on September 12, 1966, and later in Los Angeles, on September 19, 1966. The public introduction of the new model was on September 26, 1966. The Camaro officially went on sale in dealerships on September 29, 1966, for the 1967 model year.

First generation (1967–1969) 

The first-generation Camaro debuted in September 1966. It was produced for the 1967 through 1969 model years on a new rear-wheel drive GM F-body platform as a two-door 2+2 in coupé and convertible models. The base engine was 
Concerned with the runaway success of the Ford Mustang, Chevrolet executives realized that the sporty version of their compact rear-wheel drive Corvair, the Monza, would not be able to generate the sales volume of the Mustang due to limitations with that layout (including its inability to share the whole range of Chevrolet engines) and declining sales, partly due to the negative publicity from Ralph Nader's book, Unsafe at Any Speed. Therefore, the Camaro was touted as having the same conventional rear-drive, front-engine configuration as the Mustang. In addition, the Camaro could borrow parts from the existing Chevy Nova the way the Mustang did from the Ford Falcon. The first-generation Camaro lasted until the 1969 model year and eventually inspired the design of the new retro fifth-generation Camaro.

The first-generation was available in Super Sport, Rally Sport, and beginning in December 1966 the high-performance Z/28, models. It came with stripes on the hood and trunk (that could be deleted at no charge), styled rally road wheels, and a special  V8 engine that had been developed for Trans Am series racing. The front vent windows were discontinued after the 1967 model year while safety side marker lights were introduced for 1968 models.

Second generation (1970–1981) 

Introduced in February 1970, the second-generation Camaro was produced through the 1981 model year, with cosmetic changes made for the 1974 and 1978 model years. The car was heavily restyled and became somewhat larger and wider with the new styling. Based on the F-body platform, the new Camaro was similar to its predecessor, with a unibody structure, front subframe, an A-arm front suspension, and leaf springs to control the solid rear axle. The 1980 and 1981 Z28 models included an air induction hood scoop with an intake door that opened under full throttle. The RS SS package was dropped in 1972 and reintroduced in 1996.

Road & Track included the 1971 SS350 as one of the 10 best cars in the world in August 1971.

Third generation (1982–1992) 

The third-generation Camaro was produced from 1981 (for the 1982 model year) until 1992. These were the first Camaros to offer modern fuel injection, Turbo-Hydramatic 700R4 four-speed automatic transmissions, five-speed manual transmissions, 14-, 15- or 16-inch road wheels, a standard OHV 4-cylinder engine, and hatchback bodies. The cars were nearly  lighter than the second-generation model.

The IROC-Z was introduced in 1985 and continued through 1990. National Highway Traffic Safety Administration (NHTSA) Regulations required a CHMSL (Center High Mounted Stop Lamp) starting with the 1986 model year. For 1986, the new brake light was located on the exterior of the upper center area of the back hatch glass. Additionally, the 2.5 L Iron Duke pushrod 4-cylinder engine was dropped, and all base models now came with the 2.8 L V6 (OHV). For 1987 and later, the CHMSL was either mounted inside the upper hatch glass or integrated into a rear spoiler (if equipped). In 1985, the  small block V8 was available with indirect injection called "tuned port injection" (TPI). In 1987 the L98  V8 engine became a regular option on the IROC-Z, paired with an automatic transmission only. The convertible body style returned in 1987 after being last produced in 1969, and all models came with a special "20th Anniversary Commemorative Edition" leather map pocket. The 1992 models offered a "25th Anniversary Heritage Package" that included stripes and a unique spoiler plaque. Beginning in 1988, the 1LE performance package was introduced, optional on street models, and for showroom stock racing in the U.S. and Canada. The B4C, or "police" package, was made available beginning in 1991. This created a Z28 in more subtle RS styling.

Fourth generation (1993–2002) 

The fourth-generation Camaro debuted in 1993 on an updated F-body platform. It retained the same characteristics since its introduction in 1967: a coupé body style with 2+2 seating (with an optional T-top roof) or convertible (reintroduced in 1994), rear-wheel drive, pushrod 6-cylinder and V8 engines. The standard engine from 1993 through 1995 was a 3.4 L V6, then a 3.8 L V6 was introduced in 1995. A 350 MPFI (LT1) Small Block V-8 engine, which was introduced in the Corvette in 1992, was standard in the Z28. Optional equipment included all-speed traction control and a new six-speed T-56 manual transmission; the 4L60E 4-speed automatic transmission was standard on the Z28, yet optional on the V6 models which came with a 5-speed manual as standard. Anti-lock brakes were standard equipment on all Camaros.

A limited quantity of the SS version (1996-1997) came with the 330 HP LT4 small block engine from the Corvette, although most were equipped with the 275 hp LT1. The 1997 model year included a revised interior, and the 1998 models included exterior styling changes and a switch to GM's aluminum block LS1 used in the Corvette C5. The SS versions (1998-2002) received slightly improved exhaust and intake systems, bigger wheels and tires, a slightly revised suspension for improved handling and grip while retaining ride comfort, an arc-shaped rear wing for downforce, and different gearing ratios for faster acceleration, over the Z28 models. Chevrolet offered a 35th-anniversary edition for the 2002 model year.

Production of the F-Body platform was discontinued due to slowing sales, a deteriorating market for sports coupés, and plant overcapacity, but an entirely new platform went on sale in 2009. The B4C Special Service Package for police agencies was carried over from the 3rd generation & sold between 1993 and 2002.

Fifth generation (2010–2015) 

The Camaro received a complete redesign and new platform in 2009 for the 2010 model year and fifth generation. Based on the 2006 Camaro Concept and 2007 Camaro Convertible Concept, production of the fifth-generation Camaro was approved on August 10, 2006. The Oshawa Car Assembly plant in the city of Oshawa, Ontario, Canada, began producing the new Camaro which went on sale in spring of 2009 as a 2010 model year vehicle.

Following the development of the Zeta architecture and because of its position as the GM global center of RWD development, GM Holden in Australia led the final design, engineering, and development of the Camaro. Production of the coupé began on March 16, 2009, in LS, LT, and SS trim levels. LS and LT models include a  V6 producing  for the 2010 and 2011 models mated to either a 6-speed manual or a 6-speed automatic with manual shift. The SS features the  LS3 V8 producing  and is paired with a 6-speed manual. The RS appearance package is available on both the LT and SS and features 20-inch wheels with a darker gray tone, halo rings around xenon headlamps, a unique spoiler, and red RS or SS badges.

In addition to the original 2012 Camaro LS model. Chevrolet offered a 2LS model with a 2.92 rear axle ratio that increased fuel economy. The base engine 2012 model had a higher redline than previous V6 models, now reaching 7200 rpm. Almost all 2LS models had various styles of a rear spoiler.

On April 1, 2010, the Camaro was named the World Car Design of the Year at the World Car of the Year Awards.

In late January 2011, the production of the 2011 Camaro Convertibles started. The first going to Rick Hendrick via Barrett-Jackson Car Auction. Convertibles had the same options as the coupé (engines, RS, SS, etc.). The Camaro convertible added an aluminum brace over the engine assembly, and under the transmission. Due to the 2011 Fukushima earthquake, certain pigments were not available to make certain colors.

In November 2011, the export version (excluding the Japanese version) of the Camaro was introduced after a two-year delay. The delay was due to unexpected domestic demand. The export version included different tail lamps with integrated reverse and amber turn signal lamps, larger external rearview mirrors with integrated side turn signal repeaters, a rear bumper without reverse light inserts, and other changes as to comply with ECE regulations.

Although not in continuous production for the entire period, the 2012 model year marked the 45th anniversary of the Camaro and this was commemorated with a model available only in "Carbon Flash Metallic" paint. This edition Camaro also included a unique stripe package, red, white, and blue interior stitching as well as 45th edition exclusive 20-inch wheels. The V6 was updated to a 3.6 L "LFX" engine producing . The SS model received an upgrade to the suspension system. All models received the RS spoiler and taillight details, steering wheel-mounted volume and radio controls, and Bluetooth connectivity controls as standard. The 2012 ZL1 Camaro included a 6.2 L LSA supercharged V8 producing . This engine was first used in the Cadillac CTS-V for the 2009 model year. Other features included a 2-stage exhaust, the addition of suede seats, steering wheel, and shift knob, as well as ZL1-exclusive 20-inch aluminum wheels. In 2012, Chevrolet unveiled the production of the 2013 Camaro ZL1 Convertible.

The 2014 Camaro was unveiled at the 2013 New York Auto Show, with a refreshed body style and the return of a Z/28 model. Upgrades included a slimmer grille along with a larger lower fascia and new fog lights along with taillights that took styling cues from the original first-generation Camaro. The RS appearance package incorporates LEDs into both the headlights and taillights. The Z/28 model features a high-performance 7.0 L LS7 V8 engine that produces , the same engine used in the C6 Z06 Corvette. The new Z/28 features upgrades intended to improve lap times, and as with the original Z/28, air conditioning is an option. The Z/28 model retains only one speaker for the seat belt chime, the rear quarter glass has been thinned, rear seats have been thinned, and most of the sound deadening has been removed in an effort to reduce the weight of the vehicle.

Sixth generation (2016–present) 

On May 16, 2015, Chevrolet introduced the sixth generation Camaro at Belle Isle park in Detroit. The launch, complete with previous generation Camaros on display, coincided with the vehicle's upcoming 50th birthday.

The sixth generation Camaro sales began in late 2015 and offered in LT and SS models built on the GM Alpha platform at Lansing Grand River Assembly in Michigan. The Alpha platform is also used by the Cadillac ATS. The 2016 Camaro weighs  less than its predecessor. Over 70% of the sixth generation's architectural components are unique to the car and are not shared with any other current GM product.

Motor Trend named the 2016 Camaro its "Car of the Year".

The 2016 Camaro come equipped with both Apple CarPlay and Android Auto Capability features.

For the 2017 model year, the 1LE performance package returns to the Camaro. The package builds off the success of the previous-generation 1LE, offering increased handling and track performance. In response to customer demand, Chevrolet offers two distinct 1LE packages, for both V6 and V8 models, each visually distinguished with a satin black hood and specific wheels. The 2017 ZL1 Camaro has a top speed of 198 mph, and a Nürburgring Nordschleife lap time of 7:29.60
The 2017 ZL1 edition is also one of the first cars with a 10-speed automatic transmission, making it the most unique one in its form.

For the 2018 model year, Chevrolet introduced the ZL1 1LE package for the Camaro. The new package tested to be three seconds faster around General Motors' Milford Road Course than the next-fastest ZL1 Camaro. The ZL1 1LE performance package introduces improved aerodynamics, a new racing-inspired adjustable suspension, and new lightweight forged aluminum wheels with Goodyear Eagle F1 Supercar 3R tires created especially for the ZL1 1LE. The ZL1 1LE shares the ZL1's supercharged  LT4 engine paired with a six-speed manual transmission with Active Rev Match. The 2018 ZL1 1LE, a manual transmission model driven by Camaro ride and handling engineer Bill Wise, clocked a Nurburgring Nordschleife time of 7:16.04, which was a substantial 13.56 seconds faster than the previous model year's non-1LE ZL1 with automatic transmission.

Racing 

The Camaro was one of the vehicles in the SCCA-sanctioned Trans-Am Series. Chevrolet worked with Roger Penske to operate their unofficially factory-backed Trans Am team, winning the title in 1968 and 1969 with Mark Donohue. Jim Hall's Chaparral team replaced Penske for the 1970 season. Warren Agor of Rochester, NY, was the series' leading Camaro privateer, his orange #13's o, 1993, 1994, and 1998.

There was also another SCCA Trans-Am Series Camaro that was not popular because of racing but because of its body modifications. This Camaro, number 13, had been built and driven by Henry “Smokey” Yunick. Smokey Yunick was a car builder who worked to reduce the weight of his cars by acid-dipping body parts and installing thinner safety glass.

Camaro-styled cars also race in the NASCAR Xfinity Series, with all Chevrolet teams having used the body since 2013.

The Penske/Donohue Camaros also had the front sheet metal dropped, all four fenders widened, the windshield laid back, the front sub-frame “Z’d” to lower the car, the floor pan moved up and even the drip-rails were moved closer to the body. This Camaro had always kept its stock look and had a 302 engine that was able to produce . One part that had come out of his testing was the Edelbrock Cross-Manifold.

Bob Jane won both the 1971 and 1972 Australian Touring Car Championships at the wheel of a Camaro.

The Camaro was the official car of and used in the International Race of Champions starting in 1975 and lasting for 12 years until 1989. It was the first American car of the series succeeding the Porsche Carrera RSR.

Camaros are a favorite in drag racing, having won many championships, and can be currently found in several series from the National Hot Rod Association, International Hot Rod Association, and United States Hot Rod Association. Road racing Camaros can currently be found in the Sports Car Club of America's American Sedan series. They have also been the vehicle used in the Swedish Camaro Cup series since 1975.

The Camaro was the Indianapolis 500 Pace Car in 1967, 1969, 1982, 1993, 2009, 2010, 2011, 2014, and 2016. The Camaro also paced races at Daytona, Watkins Glen, Mosport in Canada, and Charlotte Motor Speedway.

The Camaro was also a regular in the IMSA GT Series.

The fifth-generation Camaro took to the tracks in 2010 in the GT class of the Grand Am Road Racing Championship. Stevenson Motorsports announced that it was seeking to run a two-car team of Pratt & Miller built cars, based on the same spaceframe as the Pontiac GXP-R. The team also competed with Camaros in the Grand Sports class of the Grand-Am's Continental Tire Challenge.

The Camaro ZL1 was introduced in the Monster Energy NASCAR Cup Series in 2018, replacing the discontinued Chevrolet SS. On February 18, 2018, Austin Dillon won the Daytona 500 in the ZL1's debut. In the 2020 season, Chase Elliott won the Camaro's first NASCAR Championship in the last race of the season.

In 2023, the Chevrolet Camaro ZL1 will join the Australian Supercars Championship to replace the Holden Commodore ZB. The prototype will run demonstration runs at all rounds of the 2022 Supercars Championship

Sales

In popular culture 

General Motors has made product placement, or embedded marketing, deals for the Chevrolet Camaro in numerous media.

The vehicle mode of the fictional character Bumblebee in the 2007 film, Transformers, is first depicted as a 1976 Camaro and later a fifth-generation concept variant. A modified fifth-generation Camaro reprises the role of Bumblebee in the sequels, Transformers: Revenge of the Fallen, and Transformers: Dark of the Moon. Bumblebee takes on the form of a modified 1967 Camaro in Transformers: Age of Extinction, and later a sixth-generation concept Camaro. He also returns as a modified 2016 Camaro in Transformers: The Last Knight. The final moments of the 2018 film Bumblebee reveal that the Camaro was the third-ever form that he took on upon arriving on Earth, after a Jeep and a Volkswagen Beetle.

Hot Wheels has been making several versions of the Camaro since 1968, with the "Custom Camaro" being the first of the original lineup. Chevrolet worked with Lego to create a special "Lego Speed Champions" version of the Camaro.

References

External links 

 
 
 

 
Camaro
Muscle cars
Rear-wheel-drive vehicles
Coupés
Pony cars
Convertibles
Hatchbacks
Chevrolet Camaro (first generation)
1970s cars
1980s cars
1990s cars
2000s cars
2010s cars
2020s cars
Motor vehicles manufactured in the United States